Leonard Tepper (July 3, 1939 – June 7, 2001) was an American actor and comedian known for his frequent cameo appearances on the Late Show with David Letterman between 1994 and 1998. His filmography includes Home Alone 2: Lost in New York, Class of Nuke'Em High, and The Shaman. He also appeared in a Miller Lite commercial and the video for Mariah Carey's Fantasy.

Early life
He graduated from Thomas Jefferson High School in Brooklyn, New York in 1956.

Filmography

References

External links
 

1939 births
2001 deaths
People from Brooklyn